Freddie North (born 28 May 1939, Nashville, Tennessee) is an American R&B singer.

North had experience as a disc jockey at WLAC-Nashville and in promotion for Nashboro Records, who released gospel music. In 1971, he released an album, Friend, on Mankind Records (U.S. #179, U.S. R&B Albums #41). The disc yielded two hit singles, "She's All I Got" (U.S. #39, U.S. R&B Singles #10) and "You and Me Together Forever".

References

1939 births
Living people
American male singers
Singers from Tennessee